The 2013 Malaysia Cup Final was a football match which was played on 3 November 2013, to determine the winners of the 2013 Malaysia Cup. It was the final of the 87th edition of the Malaysia Cup, competition organised by the Football Association of Malaysia.

The final was played between Kelantan and Pahang.

Venue
The final was held at the Shah Alam Stadium in Selangor.

Road to final

Note: In all results below, the score of the finalist is given first.

Match details

References

External links
FAM Official website

Malaysia Cup seasons
2013 in Malaysian football